Gusheh-ye Shahzadeh Qasem (also Romanized as Gūsheh-ye Shāhzādeh Qāsem and Gūsheh Shāhzādeh Qāsem; also known as Gūsheh) is a village in Sarrud-e Shomali Rural District, in the Central District of Boyer-Ahmad County, Kohgiluyeh and Boyer-Ahmad Province, Iran. At the 2006 census, its population was 1,193, in 254 families.

References 

Populated places in Boyer-Ahmad County